The 1940 NCAA Cross Country Championships were the third annual cross country meet to determine the team and individual national champions of men's collegiate cross country running in the United States.

Since the current multi-division format for NCAA championship did not begin until 1973, all NCAA members were eligible. In total, 21 teams and 90 individual runners contested this championship.

The meet was hosted by Michigan State College at the Forest Akers East Golf Course in East Lansing, Michigan for the third consecutive time. Additionally, the distance for the race was 4 miles (6.4 kilometers).

The team national championship was won by the Indiana Hoosiers, their second, while the individual championship was won by Gil Dodds, from Ashland, with a time of 20:30.2.

Men's title
Distance: 4 miles

Team Result

References
 

NCAA Cross Country Championships
NCAA Cross Country Championships
Sports competitions in East Lansing, Michigan
NCAA Cross Country
November 1940 sports events
Michigan State University
Track and field in Michigan